The National Cadet Corps (NCC) is a military cadet corps youth organisation supported by the Ministry of Defence and the Ministry of Education. As of 2020, it had a total strength of more than 11,000 members, consisting of officers, cadet officers, and cadets, amongst others. The Corps is represented in 125 secondary schools with a total of 146 units – 108 Land units, 20 Air units and 18 Sea units.

It is one of the country's oldest youth organisations, formed in 1901.

Mission & Vision

Mission 
To nurture inspiring leaders and committed citizens through fun, adventurous and military-related activities.

Vision 
Extraordinary Youth Leaders

NCC Key Thrust & Core Values

Key Thrust 
NCC is guided by three thrusts – Leadership, Fitness and Commitment to Singapore. YES

Core Values 
NCC is driven by 8 core values.

 Loyalty to Country
 Uprightness
 Leadership
 Discipline
 Commitment & Responsibility
 Care for Fellow Cadets
 Adventurous Spirit
 Safety

NCC Cadet Strong Framework 
An NCC cadet is 'Cadet Strong', with a resilient mind, fit body and committed heart.

He/she is also a self-motivated leader.

 Resilient Mind – Cadet is confident to take on challenges and persevere in the face of adversity to overcome setbacks.
 Fit Body – Cadet takes ownership to maintain his/her physical fitness and adopt healthy living habits.
 Committed Heart – Cadet lives by the NCC Core Values with a strong sense of purpose to serve his/her team, school and nation. Cadet is proactive and passionate about developing his/her own abilities.

Brief history 
The NCC traces its origins to the Cadet Corps of the Raffles Institution, the first Singaporean military cadet schools organization established in 1901 during its days as a British colony. Originally affiliated to British Armed Forces units stationed in the island and later on the Malaysian Armed Forces, the current tri-service character of the Corps dates from 1969, when the NCC was formalized as the country's sole military cadet organization when the then separate cadet forces affiliated to the young SAF were merged into one organization.

Activities
Within the framework of the training programme, NCC cadets have the opportunity of taking part in many activities.

Training Days
Every unit conducts training at least once a week. Training Days begin by the calling in of all cadets into their respective platoon by either the Unit Sergeant Major or Assistant Sergeant Major. The location is usually outside of the School's NCC room or somewhere under shelter on rainy days.

Muster Parade 
Upon falling in, the Platoon Commander or Platoon Sergeants will conduct attendance taking and after the COVID-19 Pandemic, the Risk Assessment Checklist  (RAC) questions.

After all platoons have completed both attendance taking and RAC questions, either the Unit Sergeant Major or Assistant Sergeant Major will command the entire unit to Sedia, stand at attention, the USM or ASM will then proceed to start calling out the respective platoon instructor cadet (ICs) to report strength to the Teacher Officers. After this has been completed, the USM or ASM will shout out the command "Senang Di Ri", which allows all cadets to stand at ease.

After the Muster Parade has been conducted, Platoon Commander and Sergeants can begin instructing their cadets to place their bags into the NCC room, after that all platoons will be allowed to carry on with their planned activities.

The Cadet Leader or Senior Cadet Leader platoon's Platoon Commander or Sergeant will allow their cadets to assist their assigned platoon.

A typical training day includes just constant drills and occasionally, physical training.

Bersurai 
When its time for the training day to end, all platoons will return to the location where they fall in. 

Platoon Commanders or Sergeants will command their units to take their backs and check their belongings before they bersurai.

Either the Unit Sergeant Major or Assistant Sergeant Major will conduct the bersurai, if its a sole platoon and with a Teacher Officer's permission, a Platoon Commander or Sergeant can bersurai instead.
 
Once the command has been given, all cadets will turn to their right, and take three steps while shouting out "NCC", one letter for each for step.

Physical Training
Physical Training (PT) usually starts with a short warm-up, then a few sets of static exercises before the whole unit goes for a company run. Physical fitness is a criterion for the Best Unit Competition. It is also a graded component for courses.

Physical Fitness is also a key factor in the current theme of 'Cadet Strong'.

Technical Handling
All cadets have to go through Technical Handling (Trainfire) lessons as part of the NCC Basic Trainfire Package in order to learn the proper procedures of handling the SAR 21. Lessons are conducted by SAF National Servicemen Full-time (NSFs) and NCC Cadet Officers. The Basic Trainfire Package includes stripping and assembly, marksmanship fundamentals, stoppages and remedies, and weapon reloading.

Marksmanship
Cadets have the opportunity of firing a SAR 21 rifle on firing ranges. Cadets first train on the Individual Marksmanship Trainer (IMT), a computerised simulation, before progressing on to shoot at live firing ranges. Safety is always the main concern when shooting, with everything done by the book. Cadet live firing is always conducted by active armed forces personnel under the supervision of a trained Safety Officer. An armed force Medic is also attached as a safety measure.

Cadets who obtain a respectable shooting score are awarded a Marksmanship badge.

Drills
All NCC units practice drills as a means of instilling discipline and teamwork, it is also used in formal parades, for moving around military bases and moving cadets in a smart and orderly fashion.

Cadets and Cadet Officers who possess a high standard of military drill may be given Parade Appointments such as Parade Regimental Sergeant Major, and the Parade Commander.

As of 2009, a Cadet Leader from each unit will attend the Advanced Drill Course, which will enable them to learn advanced foot drills, arms drills, sword drills, colours drills, and pace stick drills.

Units have Freestyle Exhibition Drill teams which specialise in performing display drills and the newly introduced Precision Drill Squad who perform with Lee-Enfield Mk-IV rifles.

Unit 
Every NCC Unit has four platoons, these are the Junior Cadet, Senior Cadet, Cadet Leader and Senior Cadet Leader platoons:

Junior Cadet 
Every cadet that joins NCC as their Co-Curricular Activity (CCA) from Secondary 1 is automatically placed into the lowest-ranked platoon, the Junior Cadet platoon. The platoon's staff will consist of the Unit Sergeant Major as the Platoon Commander and the Assistant Sergeant Major as the Platoon Sergeant until the stepping down of the Senior Cadet Leaders from their appointment positions, then the probational Platoon Commander and Platoon Sergeant from the Cadet Leader platoon will take over.

Junior Cadets have no rank when first joining, they will only receive their first rank, "Lance Corporal" after completing the 	
Junior Cadet Proficiency Test which usually occurs in the middle of the year.

Senior Cadet 
When a cadet reaches Secondary 2, their platoon will be re-named into the "Senior Cadet Platoon", another change of the platoon's leadership will occur when the now Senior Cadet Leaders steps down from their appointment positions, letting the Cadet Leaders of the same year that the cadet became Secondary 2 take over as the probational Platoon Commander and Platoon Sergeant. 

Senior Cadets are able to attain the second NCC rank "Corporal" by completing the Senior Cadet Proficiency Test which usually occurs in the middle of the year.

Cadet Leader 
When a cadet reaches Secondary 3, the platoon that they are a part of will be renamed into the "Cadet Leader Platoon". Cadet Leaders will only be under the command of their last year's Platoon Commander and Platoon Sergeant until they step down from their appointment positions. The Cadet Leaders will then be assigned to appointment positions that are the leadership positions of the platoon, under a probation period of 6 months.

If not given an appointment position, a Cadet Leader will be expected to assist their assigned lower platoon as Assistant Instructors by assisting the platoon's appointment holders.

Cadet Leaders are able to attain the third NCC rank "Third Sergeant" by completing the Specialist Assessment.

If the Cadet Leader platoon is the leadership platoon for that specific year, they will place their bags into the NCC Room once the S4 or AS4 opens the room.

Senior Cadet Leader 
When a cadet reaches Secondary 4, it will be their last year within their NCC Unit, the platoon they are apart of will be re-named into the "Senior Cadet Leader" platoon. This platoon has no difference compared to the Cadet Leader platoon aside from the name change.

At about the end of the school's term 1 or when the school's term 2 begins. The Senior Cadet Leaders will step down from their appointment positions in the Passing-Out-Parade (POP) that takes up an entire training session.

After the POP, Senior Cadet Leaders will no longer need to attend any training sessions within their NCC Unit.

Cadet Officer 
A Cadet Officer is either a Unit Sergeant Major or Assistant Sergeant Major, who was selected for the Cadet Officer Course and was able to successfully complete it.

Only one cadet from each NCC Unit is given the opportunity to be able to become a Cadet Officer.

Upon becoming a Cadet Officer, cadets under them will have to refer to this cadet as "Sir" or "Ma'am" depending on gender.

Appointment Positions 
Appointment Positions are the cadet leadership roles of a NCC Unit and are held by Senior Cadet Leaders until their POP Parade, which is when they step down from their positions. After the SCL POP Parade, the top cadets from the Cadet Leader platoon will be given an appointment position, which are: Unit Sergeant Major (USM), Assistant Sergeant Major (ASM), Head of Logistics (S4), Assistant Head of Logistics (AS4), Platoon Commander (PC) and Platoon Sergeant (PS).

These appointment positions have a probational period of 6 months, during the probation period, if a cadet is found to be ineffective at their roles, they can be stripped of their position.

Unit Sergeant Major 
The Unit Sergeant Major or USM for short is the highest appointment position, the head Instructor Cadet (IC) of the entire unit. They are in charge of conducting the muster parade or bersurai of the entire unit, the training session itself and overseeing the platoons of the unit. Only one person is able to hold this appointment position at a time. 

The cadet that holds this position is eligible for obtaining the following ranks/or positions: Cadet Officer, Master Sergeant (MSGT), Staff Sergeant (SSGT), First Sergeant (1SGT), and Third Sergeant (3SGT).

The Unit Sergeant Major will also become the Junior Cadet's Platoon Commander when they become a Senior Cadet Leader.

Assistant Sergeant Major 
The Assistant Sergeant Major or ASM for short is the second highest appointment position, they work along with the Unit Sergeant Major to conduct the training session, conducting the muster parade or bersurai of the entire unit and overseeing the unit's platoons. Only one person is able to hold this appointment position at a time. 

The cadet that holds this position is eligible of obtaining the following ranks/or position: Cadet Officer, Master Sergeant (MSGT), Staff Sergeant (SSGT), First Sergeant (1SGT) and Third Sergeant (3SGT).

The Assistant Sergeant Major will also become the Junior Cadet's Platoon Sergeant when they become a Senior Cadet Leader.

Head of Logistics 
The Head of Logistics or S4 is the cadet in-charge of the school's NCC room, they are responsible for the items that are kept within the NCC room and for the keys that are used to open the NCC room. While in the NCC room, they hold the most authority out of any other cadet. Only one person is able to hold this appointment position at a time.

The cadet that holds this position is eligible of obtaining the following ranks: Staff Sergeant (SSGT), First Sergeant (1SGT) and Third Sergeant (3SGT).

Assistant Head of Logistics 
The Assistant Head of Logistics or AS4 is the assistant to the S4, they are responsible for the items that are kept within the NCC room and will usually hold the keys to the NCC room if the S4 is not at school. While in the NCC room, they hold authority over any other cadet except the S4. Only one person is able to hold this appointment position at a time.

The cadet that holds this position is eligible of obtaining the following ranks: Staff Sergeant (SSGT), First Sergeant (1SGT) and Third Sergeant (3SGT).

Platoon Commander 
Every platoon, which ranges from the Junior Cadet platoon to the Senior Cadet Leader platoon will have a Platoon Commander or PC for short, they are the head Instructor Cadet (IC) of the entire platoon and are in-charge of the training session for that particular platoon. Only one person is able to hold this appointment position at a time.

Once the NCC Unit has fallen in from the command of the Assistant Sergeant Major or Unit Sergeant Major. The Platoon Commander will have to take attendance of all present cadets of their respective platoon and ask the Risk Assessment Checklist (RAC) questions.

Platoon Sergeant 
Every platoon, which ranges from the Junior Cadet platoon to the Senior Cadet Leader platoon will have one or more Platoon Sergeants or PS for short, they are the second in-charged of the entire platoon, behind the Platoon Commander. They assist in helping to conduct the training session with the Platoon Commander.

Once the NCC Unit has fallen in from the command of the Assistant Sergeant Major or Unit Sergeant Major. The Platoon Sergeant will have to take attendance of all present cadets of their respective platoon and ask the Risk Assessment Checklist (RAC) questions.

Leadership Courses
Every cadet is a leader and will influence their peers to do well and focus on completing the objective at hand. Under the NCC Syllabus, there are a few Leadership Courses for NCC Cadets to attend.

Physical Training Instructor (PTI) Course 

The PTI course is designed for Secondary 2 or Secondary 3 cadets who have an interest in being a physical fitness instructor. They are taught the various ways of conducting physical fitness lessons and are equipped with the basic theory of physical fitness. The PTI course is a great training aid for cadets' fitness, as they will have the necessary skills to lead their unit in physical fitness training to attain Gold for their NAPFA test.

Senior Specialist Leaders Course 

Senior Specialist Leaders Course (SSLC) is a 3-days-2-nights course that serves as a replacement for the previous Senior Specialist Course and Leaders Camp.  The Cadet Leaders will further enhance their leadership skills by working together during team activities and develop a resilient mind through camping and challenging activities. They will experience activities such as Advanced Foot and Arms Drills, Urban Operations, Knots & Lashings and the Fitness Challenge, etc. Cadets who are selected to join the course are given high expectations in order to graduate and earn their NCC First Sergeant (1SG) rank.

Cadet Officer Course 

The Cadet Officer course is a gruelling 2-week course, designed for our cadets who have graduated from their secondary school education. Upon entering the course, the cadets will participate as Cadet Officer-Trainees (CDTs) and will learn how to manage and work better as a team as they go through the daily programmes. Through situational tests and scenarios, Trainees will also acquire the knowledge of how to plan and execute events/training effectively by working with their team-mates. Trainees have the opportunity to hone their leadership skills, as every Trainee is put in a position to lead their platoon. During the 2 weeks, Cadet Officer-Trainees are expected to exemplify themselves as effective leaders and graduate as a full-fledged Cadet Officer (C/OFFR).

Teacher Officer Course 

The Teacher Officer Course is a 2-week course, designed for newly appointed NCC Teachers-in-charge. Upon entering the course, the teachers will participate as NCC Officer-Cadets (OCTs). The course provides the teachers with a better understanding of the NCC Curriculum and the programmes their cadets get to experience during their NCC journey. The course will aid teachers in conducting training sessions for their cadets in their respective units. Upon graduation, the teachers will graduate as NCC 2nd Lieutenants (2LT), or a higher rank depending on their rank in NS, and are thereafter appointed as Teacher Officers.

Adventure Training
Junior Cadets (Secondary 1 cadets) attend an outdoor camp for at least 2 days and 1 night conducted by their school's unit. From 2008 onwards, they will also attend Camp FORGE, an adventure-based experiential day camp held in NCC Campus. The acronym FORGE stands for Fun with friendship, Orientation with outdoor activities, Responsibility and resilience building, and Experiential learning. Cadets are given opportunities to participate in activities such as archery, paint-ball gun competition and the Flying Fox, amongst many adventure facilities.

Senior Cadets (Secondary 2 cadets), will attend Camp STEEL. STEEL stands for Standards, Tenacity, Emotional Intelligence, Energy and Leadership. This is a 1 Day non-residential camp during which cadets participate in more challenging adventure training like the Rappelling Wall, Advanced Paintball Challenge, Weapons Technical Handling, Team Building, and Team Learning, and basic Emotional Intelligence (EI) to become better leaders themselves, as well as of their peers and juniors.

Cadets are also provided many opportunities to attend adventure courses locally and overseas. The following are some of the courses available:
 Annual Kayaking Expedition
 Exercise PUNCAK (Mount Ophir Expedition)
 Midshipman Sea Training Deployment (MSTD)

NCC cadets are also able to attend prestigious courses such as the Basic Diving Course conducted by the RSN Naval Diving Unit, as well as the Basic Airborne Course conducted by the Singapore Armed Forces Commando Formation

The NCC is constantly seeking new adventure programmes to broaden the experiences and horizons of its cadets.

International Cadet Exchange Programmes
Every year selected cadets are given the opportunity to participate in various international exchanges with cadets from countries such as Australia, Brunei, Canada, New Zealand, the United Kingdom, the United States of America, Hong Kong, India and China.

The Singapore National Cadet Corps Command Band 
The Singapore NCC Command Band is the musical unit of the National Cadet Corps and Swiss Cottage Secondary School.  Serving the Corps since 1999, the Command Band's mission is to provide musical support for HQ NCC's military occasions such as the Teacher Officer Course Graduation Parade, Cadet Officer Course Graduation Parade, and Affirmation Ceremonies.

In addition to serving HQ NCC, the Command Band has also provided musical support for the Singapore Armed Forces and Singapore Civil Defence Force. Other military-related ceremonies which the Command Band is also involved in would include the Remembrance Day and War Memorial Services organised by the SAF Veterans League and the Singapore Chinese Chamber of Commerce and Industry.

Since 2010, the Singapore NCC Command Band has been part of the Combined Band, providing the parade music for the Parade and Ceremony Segment of the National Day Parade.

The Director of Music is MAJ (NCC) Anthony Chew.

People

Commandants
 LTC J P Durcan (January 1969 – June 1970)
 LTC Mohd Salleh (June 1970 – December 1970)
 MAJ Syed Hashim Aljoffrey (January 1971 – March 1972)
 MAJ Yeo Peck Chua (April 1972 – January 1980)
 COL John Morrice (February 1980 – February 1981)
 MAJ Yeo See Cheh (March 1981 – April 1983)
 LTC Toh Chee Keong (1 May 1983 – 31 December 1990)
 LTC George Ho Yat Yuen (1 January 1991 – 16 October 1994)
 LTC Swee Boon Chai (17 October 1994 – 30 June 1997)
 LTC Yeo Yoon Soon (1 July 1997 – 31 March 2000)
 LTC Phua Puay Hiong (1 April 2000 – 10 January 2003)
 LTC Lim Teong Lye (11 January 2003 – 16 December 2004)
 LTC Colin Wong (17 December 2004 – 8 June 2007)
 LTC Stuart Khoo (8 June 2007 – 3 December 2008)
 LTC Adrian Koh (3 December 2008 – 10 January 2013)
 LTC Johnny Yeo Yew Kuan (10 January 2013 – 5 February 2016)
 LTC Richard Koh Ban Chuan (5 February 2016 – 21 November 2019)
 LTC Joey Wong (21 November 2019 – 11 January 2023)
 LTC Ong Siong Beng (11 January 2023 - Present)

Regimental Sergeant Major
 1WO Christopher Bryan (? – 13 October 2017)
 1WO Pheong Siew Shya (13 October 2017 – 29 September 2021)
 1WO Susan Lee Siok San (29 September 2021 – present)

Director of Music
 MAJ (NCC) Anthony Chew (1999–present)

See also
 Australian Defence Force Cadets
 Bangladesh National Cadet Corps
 Canadian Cadet Organizations
 Combined Cadet Force
 Junior Reserve Officers' Training Corps
 National Cadet Corps (Ghana)
 National Cadet Corps (India)
 National Cadet Corps (Sri Lanka)
 New Zealand Cadet Forces

References

External links
 National Cadet Corps Act

Youth organisations based in Singapore
Military education and training in Singapore
Military of Singapore
1901 establishments in Singapore
Military units and formations established in 1901